Andreas Weber (born 3 April 1953) is a German former swimmer. He competed in three events at the 1972 Summer Olympics.

References

External links
 

1953 births
Living people
German male swimmers
Olympic swimmers of West Germany
Swimmers at the 1972 Summer Olympics
Sportspeople from Darmstadt
20th-century German people